Annemarie (or Annamarie, Annmarie) is a Danish, Dutch and German feminine given name. It is merging of the names Anne and Marie.

Notable people named Annemarie
 Annemarie Biechl (born 1949), German politician
 Annemarie Bischofberger (born 1960), Swiss alpine skier
 Annemarie Bostroem (1922–2015), German poet, playwright, and lyricist
 Princess Annemarie de Bourbon de Parme (born 1977), Dutch journalist and consultant
 Annemarie Buchmann-Gerber (1947–2015), Canadian textile artist
 Annemarie Buchner (1924–2014), German alpine skier
 Annemarie Cox (born 1966), Dutch-born Australian sprint canoeist
 Annemarie Davidson (1920–2012), American copper enamel artist
 Annemarie Düringer (1925–2014), Swiss actress
 Annemarie Ebner (born 1940s), Austrian luger
 Annemarie Eilfeld (born 1990), German singer and songwriter
 Annemarie Esche (born 1925), German Burmese scholar
 Annemarie Forder (born 1978), Australian sport shooter
 Annemarie von Gabain (1901–1993), German Turkic scholar
 Annemarie Gerg (born 1975), German alpine skier
 Annemarie Gethmann-Siefert (born 1945), German philosopher
 Annemarie Groen (born 1955), Dutch swimmer
 Annemarie Hase (1900–1971), German actress and cabaret artist
 Annemarie Heinrich (1915–2005), German-born Argentine photographer
 Annemarie Huber-Hotz (born 1948), Federal Chancellor of Switzerland
 Annemarie Huste (1943–2016), German chef
 Annemarie Jacir (born 1974), Palestinian filmmaker and poet
 Annemarie Jorritsma (born 1951), Dutch Minister of Economics
 Annemarie Kleinert (born 1947), German historian
 Annemarie Kramer (born 1975), Dutch sprinter
 Annemarie Kremer (born 1974), Dutch operatic soprano
 Annemarie Leibbrand-Wettley (1913–1996), German medical historian
 Annemarie Lorentzen (1921–2008), Norwegian government minister
 Annemarie Mol (born 1958), Dutch ethnographer and philosopher
 Annemarie Moser-Pröll (born 1953), Austrian alpine skier
 Annemarie von Nathusius (1874–1926), German novelist
 Annemarie Oestreicher (1875–1945), German politician
 Annemarie Părău (born 1984), Romanian basketball player
 Annemarie Penn-te Strake (born 1953), Dutch lawyer, mayor of Maastricht
 Annemarie Reinhard (1921–1976), German writer
 Annemarie Renger (1919–2008), German SPD politician
 Annemarie Roelofs (born 1955), Dutch trombone player and violinist
 Annemarie Roeper (1918–2012), Pioneer for gifted education
 Annemarie Sanders (born 1958), Dutch equestrian
 Annemarie Schimmel (1922–2003), German Orientalist
 Annemarie Schwarzenbach (1908–1942), Swiss writer, journalist, photographer and traveler
 Annemarie Selinko (1914–1986), Austrian novelist
 Annemarie Sörensen (1913–1993), German singer and film actress
 Annemarie Spilker (born 1980), Dutch photographer
 Annemarie Steinsieck (1889–1977), German actress
 Annemarie Verstappen (born 1965), Dutch swimmer
 Annemarie Wendl (1914–2006), German actress
 Annemarie Werner-Hansen (1939–1993), Danish sprint canoer
 Annemarie Wright (born 1979), English artist

Notable people named Annmarie
 Annmarie Adams (born 1960), Canadian architectural historian
 Annmarie Morais (born 1973), Jamaican-Canadian screenwriter
 Annmarie O'Riordan (born 1990), Irish singer
 AnnMarie Thomas, American mechanical engineer

See also
 Annemarie and Her Cavalryman
 Annemarie, the Bride of the Company
 Helmuth and Annemarie Sell

References

Dutch feminine given names
German feminine given names